Casanova is a 1987 American made-for-television biographical romantic comedy film directed by Simon Langton. It depicts real life events of Giacomo Casanova.

Plot
Giacomo Casanova has to give up law studies because he sleeps with his teacher's daughters. He tries the priesthood but seduces a young widow. He feuds with an Austrian noble, Razetta, after stealing the latter's mistress.

He is thrown into prison but escapes. He later helps the French king establish a lotto.

Cast 

 Richard Chamberlain: Giacomo Casanova
 Faye Dunaway: Madame D'Urfe
 Sylvia Kristel: Maddalena
 Ornella Muti: Henriette
 Hanna Schygulla: Casanova's Mother
 Sophie Ward: Jacqueline
 Frank Finlay: Razetta
 Roy Kinnear: Balbi
 Kenneth Colley: Le Duc
 Richard Griffiths: Cardinal
 Patrick Ryecart 
 Jean-Pierre Cassel: Louis XV
 Toby Rolt: Young Giacomo Casanova
 Bruce Purchase: Major Grandi
 Traci Lind: Heidi
 Janis Lee Burns: Louison
 Christopher Benjamin: Massimo
 John Wells: Judge
 Michael Balfour: Jailer
 John Boswell: Prosecutor
 Marina Baker: Lucretia
 Jessica Moore: Angelique (as Gilda Germano)
 Aitana Sánchez-Gijón: Therese
 Fernando Hilbeck: Grimani

Production
The project was announced in May 1985 with Chamberlain attached.

Filming began in October 1986 and went until December. The film was shot in Spain and Italy. There were two versions – one of American television and one for European television, which was longer and contained more nudity.

"We have the classic American and European dichotomy", said Chamberlain. "For the American version the women are covered up, and then when we switch to the European version, blouses come ripping off and there is considerably more flesh."

"I think you have to be very careful about excess in television", said Chamberlain. "There were a lot of seduction scenes. But those are sort of the same the world over through the centuries. Then there were court scenes with people in fantastic court dress and lots of bowing and little comments and asides and fans fluttering. I wasn't particularly aware of being on the edge of a precipice, but I felt that one's concentration had to be very sharp to keep it real."

Chamberlain said he enjoyed playing the role "because he believed in grasping every moment of life and making the most out of it. He wasn't a tremendously high-principled man, but he lived in a time when there weren't a whole lot of highly principled people around. It was a time for fun. It was a time for frolic."

Reception
The film screened on US TV opposite I'll Take Manhattan and The Dirty Dozen: The Next Mission.

The critic from the Chicago Tribune said "broadly and clumsily directed by Simon Langton from a disappointing script by George MacDonald Fraser (there is also a longer, European version with nude sequences), it is consistently stolid and curiously lacking in sensuality--tepid Tom Jones."

The Los Angeles Times said "the film suffers for its identity crisis" and the filmmakers lacked "a clear point of view about their subject" and were "unable to establish a sustaining tone. Chamberlain's scenes with Faye Dunaway... are played as farce, while those with Ornella Muti... are played for pathos. In between are long, tedious passages... Chamberlain exudes his usual charm, but even that is put to poor use... There is little evidence of his seduction skills here. Women fling themselves at him and apparently want nothing more than his sexual favors... [the film] doesn't want to be taken very seriously, but it's too muddled and drawn out to be taken for fun, either."

References

External links

1987 television films
1987 films
1980s biographical films
1987 romantic comedy films
American romantic comedy films
American television films
American biographical films
West German films
Italian romantic comedy films
Films about Giacomo Casanova
Films set in Venice
Films set in the 18th century
Films scored by Michel Legrand
Films with screenplays by George MacDonald Fraser
English-language German films
English-language Italian films
Cultural depictions of Louis XV
Films directed by Simon Langton
1980s American films
1980s Italian films